Geumnam-myeon may refer to:

 Geumnam-myeon, Sejong
 Geumnam-myeon, Hadong County